The Prisoner of Zenda is an 1894 adventure novel by Anthony Hope.

The Prisoner of Zenda may also refer to one of its many film adaptations:
 The Prisoner of Zenda (1913 film), with James Keteltas Hackett and Beatrice Beckley
 The Prisoner of Zenda (1915 film), starring Henry Ainley and Jane Gail
 The Prisoner of Zenda (1922 film), featuring Lewis Stone and Alice Terry
 The Prisoner of Zenda (1937 film), starring Ronald Colman and Madeleine Carroll
 The Prisoner of Zenda (1952 film), with Stewart Granger and Deborah Kerr
 The Prisoner of Zenda (1979 film), featuring Peter Sellers and Lynne Frederick
 Prisoner of Zenda (1988 film), animated film produced in Australia

For a comprehensive list of other adaptations (stage, radio, TV, operetta, books, etc.), see The Prisoner of Zenda#Adaptations.